CIMX-FM (88.7 MHz, Pure Country 89) is a commercial radio station in Windsor, Ontario, Canada. It primarily serves Essex County, but has a signal that reaches the entire Detroit-Windsor metropolitan area. It is owned by Bell Media and airs a country format. CIMX's studios and offices are located on Ouellette Avenue in Windsor.

CIMX has an effective radiated power (ERP) of 78,200 watts, with a maximum of 100,000 watts. The transmitter is located off South Industrial Drive in Amherstburg.

History

CKWW-FM
What is now CIMX first signed on the air on July 10, 1967, as CKWW-FM. It was co-owned with CKWW but was separately programmed. The stations shared studios and offices at 1150 Ouellette Avenue.

CKWW-FM had an MOR/easy listening format. The station added evening progressive rock programming in the fall of 1970.

Om FM
The following April, the station changed its call sign to CJOM-FM and the progressive format went full-time. Om FM (pronounced "Ohm FM") distinguished itself from its Detroit competitors WRIF, WWWW and WABX by emphasizing Canadian talent.

By 1976, the album rock sounds of "Om FM" had faded away and the station was again programming MOR and easy listening music.

Top 40 Era
In 1982, CJOM and CKWW were acquired by Geoff Stirling's company, Stirling Communications International, which also owned CKGM in Montreal, Quebec and CHOZ-FM in St. John's, Newfoundland and Labrador. CJOM made an abrupt switch to a CHR/Top 40 format. In the late 1980s, the station went by the moniker "Laser Rock," a reference to becoming one of the first radio stations in the Detroit area to program music solely from compact discs.

CJOM ran afoul of the CRTC in the summer of 1983 for its format change to CHR/Top 40. Then as now, all radio station format changes in Canada must be approved by the CRTC. CJOM had been approved for a "contemporary MOR" (a.k.a. adult contemporary) format, but analyses of the station's programming in May 1983 showed that almost all of the music being played was rock-oriented, that the station was playing 78% "hit" music rather than the allowed <50%, and that the station was not meeting its licence commitments for "foreground", "mosaic", spoken word, or news programming.

Stirling maintained that the station was "experimenting" with its programming and that such a format was necessary in order to make the station competitive with Detroit-based broadcasters.  Stirling and the CRTC finally reached a compromise in August 1985. CJOM was granted an "experimental" licence which would enable the station to play more harder-edged rock and pop music with higher repetition, although a proposal to reduce the station's Canadian Content quotient to 5% from 15% was denied. 

Under this experimental licence, CJOM remained a CHR-formatted radio station for most of the rest of the decade. Most rock songs played were Top 40 based like songs from Def Leppard and Billy Squier or Canadian artists such as Platinum Blonde, Haywire, and Gino Vannelli. CJOM would occasionally include several songs by one artist in a "star set" during the day. On Sunday evenings, CJOM would broadcast an "album countdown" in which the station would play several songs from the same album in the countdown.

Studios and tower
In 1987, CJOM increased its transmitting power to 100,000 watts from a tower in McGregor. Before this, the station's signal did not extend much further than the Detroit/Windsor area and the station's Detroit area ratings were minimal.

The station's studios changed a few times in the years. It was originally located in the Macabee's Building next to the Wandalyn Viscount Hotel on Ouellette Avenue between Erie Street and Giles Boulevard. In late 1982, CJOM and CKNW moved to the Bob Pedler Building, located on Cabana Road East near Howard Avenue in the southern part of Windsor. Eventually, the station relocated to the former "Big 8" CKLW building, at the corner of Ouellette Avenue and Tecumseh Road West when CHUM Limited purchased the station.

The Mix to 89X
CJOM-FM became CIMX-FM in 1990. CIMX was first known as The Mix with an adult contemporary format, but disc jockey Greg St. James began playing modern rock on his evening show (8 to midnight) beginning in September 1990. This program was called "The Cutting Edge" and was eventually hosted by four different DJs, Greg St. James, Darren Revell, Michelle Denomme and Mr. Vertical.

On May 13, 1991, the modern rock format went full-time and 89X was born. The first (and ultimately, the last) song on "89X" was "Stop!" by Jane's Addiction. CIMX-FM immediately took away many listeners from other youth-oriented stations in Detroit, particularly WHYT and WDFX, and may have been at least partially responsible for WHYT's decision to switch to an alternative format a few years later.

CIMX had been owned by Canada's CHUM Limited since the late 1980s, but was sold along with the rest of CHUM's radio stations to CTVglobemedia in 2007. Its sister station, CIDR-FM, adopted an adult album alternative format in 2006, thus forcing CIMX to add more active rock songs to its playlist and go up against WRIF. Throughout the 2000s, the format has moved between alternative rock and active rock, with the station playing more metal rock than might be found on other alternative stations.

In the February 29, 2012, issue of Real Detroit Weekly, 89X was rated the best radio station in Detroit. Real Detroit Weekly also crowned 89X's own Jay Hudson the best DJ in Detroit for the fourth consecutive year.

On March 30, 2017, Bell Media announced that it would close its US-based sales office in Bingham Farms, canceled CIMX's morning show "Cal & Co.", and laid off around a dozen people as part of a restructuring of its Windsor cluster. After the changes, CIMX began to once again experience more of an active rock lean. On April 3, 2017, CIMX debuted their new morning show The Morning X, hosted by long-time personality and music director Mark McKenzie.

Pure Country 89
On November 18, 2020, Bell announced on the 89X website that CIMX would adopt a new format the next day at noon; concurrently, the station's on air staff was let go. At that time, CIMX flipped to country as Pure Country 89, launching with 10,000 songs in a row commercial free. In anticipation of the flip, Entercom flipped its Detroit station WDZH from soft adult contemporary to alternative as Alt 98.7 almost immediately after the launch of Pure Country. The current format competes locally with CJWF-FM, as well as with Detroit's WYCD and WDRQ. In other nearby markets, it competes with WWWW in Ann Arbor.

The station carries networked programming shared with other Pure Country-branded stations, including The Bobby Bones Show in mornings (unlike other Pure Country stations, where it is carried in the evening).

Live events
In addition to the various annual shows, the station holds many acoustic "Live-X" events when bands come to town. The acoustic renditions have even been used by many of the bands, including Soundgarden's re-release of King Animal, "King Animal Plus," when the band performed their song "Halfway There."

89X celebrated its first birthday in May 1992 by holding two X-Fest shows. Peter Murphy, the Nymphs, Senseless Things were a few of the bands that played X-Fest. Then in 1993, 89X held a birthday show at Chene Park featuring the Tragically Hip. The next year, 1994, 89X started throwing annual "Birthday Bash" shows. The Birthday Bash in 1994 was held at the Phoenix Plaza Amphitheater during the World Cup competitions in Pontiac. The Afghan Whigs, Beck, and the Odds were some of the bands that played.

References

External links

 
Radio-Locator information on CIMX-FM

IMX
IMX
IMX
Radio stations established in 1967
1967 establishments in Ontario